Valeri Alexeyevich Kalachikhin (20 May 1939 – 27 November 2014) was a Russian volleyball player who competed for the Soviet Union in the 1964 Summer Olympics. He was born in the Sovkhoz Vtoraya Pyatiletka near Leningradskaya, Krasnodar Krai. In 1964, he was part of the Soviet team, which won the gold medal in the Olympic tournament. He played all nine matches.

External links

Valeri Kalachikhin's obituary 

1939 births
2014 deaths
Soviet men's volleyball players
Olympic volleyball players of the Soviet Union
Volleyball players at the 1964 Summer Olympics
Olympic gold medalists for the Soviet Union
Olympic medalists in volleyball
Russian men's volleyball players
Medalists at the 1964 Summer Olympics
People from Krasnodar Krai
Sportspeople from Krasnodar Krai